James Alexander Douglas-Hamilton, Baron Selkirk of Douglas,  (born 31 July 1942) is a Scottish Conservative Party politician who served as Member of Parliament for Edinburgh West and then as a Member of the Scottish Parliament (MSP) for the Lothians region. Since 1997 he has been a member of the House of Lords as a life peer.

In 1994, he was briefly Earl of Selkirk, but disclaimed that peerage to remain in the House of Commons.

Early life
Lord James Douglas-Hamilton was born to the 14th Duke of Hamilton and the former Lady Elizabeth Percy. He was educated at Eton and Balliol College, Oxford where he was president of the Oxford Union, and thereafter at the University of Edinburgh.

Political career
He served as an advocate and an interim Procurator Fiscal Depute from 1968 to 1972. From 1972 to 1974, he was a councillor on Edinburgh District Council, and after unsuccessfully contesting Hamilton in February 1974, from October 1974 to 1997 he was Member of Parliament for Edinburgh West. During this time he served in the Scottish Office. He was briefly Falkland Pursuivant in the Court of the Lord Lyon in July 1973.

In the years between 1987 and 1995 he served as Parliamentary Under-Secretary of State for Scotland, and thereafter as Minister of State between 1995 and 1997. He had previously been a Lord Commissioner of the Treasury between 1979 and 1981. He was appointed a Privy Counsellor and Queen's Counsel in 1996.

It was announced on 12 December 2011 that he would serve as Lord High Commissioner to the General Assembly of the Church of Scotland, who is the Sovereign's personal representative to the Annual General Assembly of the Church of Scotland, in 2012.

Peerage
In 1994 on the death of George Nigel Douglas-Hamilton, 10th Earl of Selkirk, Selkirk inherited the earldom, although the succession was disputed, as Alasdair Douglas-Hamilton, a nephew of the 10th Earl, claimed it, ultimately without success. Due to the terms of the Peerage Act 1963, Selkirk was considered to be unable to vote in the House of Commons until he had disclaimed the title, even though the succession to it had not been decided. As the Conservative government of the day had a small majority, he felt obliged to disclaim immediately.

After losing his seat in the 1997 general election, he was elevated to the House of Lords as a life peer, being created Baron Selkirk of Douglas, of Cramond in the City of Edinburgh.

Scottish Parliament
From 1999 to 2007 he was a member of the Scottish Parliament and was deputy Convener of its Education Committee. In November 2005, Lord Selkirk of Douglas announced his intention to retire at the end of the 2003–2007 session of the Scottish Parliament. He continues to sit in the House of Lords, taking a particular interest in British legislation as it affects Scotland.

Books
Lord Selkirk of Douglas has written a number of books, including  Motive For a Mission: The Story Behind Hess's Flight to Britain about his father's meeting with Rudolf Hess when he landed in Scotland during World War II. He later wrote a biography on Rudolf Hess entitled `The Truth About Rudolf Hess' (2016).

Family
In 1974 he married the Hon. (Priscilla) Susan Buchan, a granddaughter of the politician and novelist John Buchan, and daughter of Lord Tweedsmuir and Baroness Tweedsmuir. They have four sons of whom the eldest, John Andrew Douglas-Hamilton, Lord Daer and Master of Selkirk (b 1978) is heir apparent to the disclaimed Earldom of Selkirk. Lord Selkirk of Douglas is also fifth in line to the Dukedom of Hamilton, after the sons and the brother of the present duke.

See also 
Commission on Scottish Devolution

References

External links 
 
 

1942 births
Living people
Members of the Scottish Parliament 1999–2003
Members of the Scottish Parliament 2003–2007
Councillors in Edinburgh
Members of the Faculty of Advocates
Scottish King's Counsel
Conservative MSPs
Earls of Selkirk
Conservative Party (UK) life peers
Life peers created by Elizabeth II
Members of the Parliament of the United Kingdom for Edinburgh constituencies
Scottish Conservative Party MPs
Members of the Privy Council of the United Kingdom
Alumni of Balliol College, Oxford
Presidents of the Oxford Union
Presidents of the Oxford University Conservative Association
Alumni of the University of Edinburgh
James Douglas-Hamilton, Baron Selkirk of Douglas
Lords High Commissioner to the General Assembly of the Church of Scotland
Douglas-Hamilton, James
Douglas-Hamilton, James
Douglas-Hamilton, James
Douglas-Hamilton, James
Douglas-Hamilton, James
UK MPs who inherited peerages
Douglas-Hamilton, James
Scottish Conservative Party councillors
Scottish officers of arms
Douglas-Hamilton
People educated at Eton College